The 2nd Artistic Gymnastics World Championships were held in Bordeaux, France, in conjunction with the 31st Federal Festival of France, on April 22-23, 1905.

Men's all around

Men's team all around

Men's horizontal bar

Men's parallel bars

Men's pommel horse

Medal table

References

World Artistic Gymnastics Championships
International gymnastics competitions hosted by France
World Artistic Gymnastics Championships, 1905
1905 in gymnastics